The Dicastery for Communication is a division (dicastery) of the Roman Curia with authority over all communication offices of the Holy See and the Vatican City State. Its various offices can be accessed through its website. These are the Pope's website and other offices such as Vatican News on internet (including the former Vatican Media Center which distributes segments for television), the Holy See Press Office, L'Osservatore Romano, Photograph Service, Vatican Radio, and the Vatican Publishing House. The Pontifical Council for Social Communications has been subsumed into this new Dicastery.

Pope Francis established the Secretariat for Communication in June 2015, with Monsignor Dario Edoardo Viganò, former director of the Vatican Television Center, as its first prefect. Viganò resigned on 21 March 2018, "a week after his mishandling of a letter from retired Pope Benedict XVI provoked a global outcry".

On 23 June 2018, the secretariat was renamed Dicastery for Communication, and on 5 July 2018, Pope Francis appointed award-winning lay journalist Paolo Ruffini as prefect. He was the first layman named to head a Vatican dicastery. Monsignor Lucio Adrian Ruiz, former head of the Vatican Internet Service, is secretary. Paul Nusiner, former General Manager of Avvenire is director general.

Members
On 13 July 2016 Pope Francis appointed the following as members of the dicastery:

Patriarch Moran Mor Béchara Boutros Raï
Cardinal John Njue
Cardinal Chibly Langlois
Cardinal Charles Maung Bo
Cardinal Leonardo Sandri 
Cardinal Beniamino Stella
Archbishop Diarmuid Martin
Archbishop Gintaras Grušas
Bishop Marcello Semeraro
Bishop Stanislas Lalanne
Bishop Pierre Nguyễn Văn Khảm
Bishop Ginés Ramón García Beltrán
Bishop Nuno Brás da Silva Martins
Alessandro Elia
Kim Daniels
Markus Schächter
Leticia Soberón Mainero

On 12 April 2017, Pope Francis expanded the Secretariat of Communication and appointed 13 new consultants:
        	    
Jacquineau Azétsop, S.J.
Fernando Giménez Barriocanal
Ann Carter
Dino Cataldo Dell'Accio
Graham Ellis
Peter Gonsalves
José María La Porte

Ivan Maffeis
James Martin, S.J.
Paolo Peverini
Eric Salobir, O.P.
Michael Paul Unland
Michael Warsaw 

On 18 December 2018, Pope Francis appointed Andrea Tornielli as Editorial Director.

On Friday December 3rd 2021, Pope Francis appointed Bishop Emmanuel Adetoyese Badejo as member of the Vatican Dicastery for Communication.

See also

Index of Vatican City-related articles

References

 
Government agencies established in 2015
Christian organizations established in 2015
2015 establishments in Vatican City